William H. White is an American writer specializing in historical novels relating to the age of sail.

Career
White served in the United States Navy during the Vietnam War.

He serves on the board of trustees of the USS Constitution Museum in Boston, the National Maritime Historical Society, and is a consultant to the replica 1812 privateer Lynx. White is also a Corresponding Fellow of the Massachusetts Historical Society.

Published works
1812 Trilogy: The Isaac Biggs Series
 A Press of Canvas (2000)
 A Fine Tops'l Breeze (2001)
 The Evening Gun (2003)

The Oliver Baldwin Series
 In Pursuit of Glory
 The Greater the Honor

Other Books
 When Fortune Frowns (2009)

Sources
 Sea Fiction Website

United States Navy officers
American historical novelists
Living people
Year of birth missing (living people)
American male novelists